Hartke is a surname. Notable people with the surname include:

Vance Hartke, American politician
Stephen Hartke, American classical composer
Gilbert V. Hartke, drama teacher and activist

Fictional characters
Eugene Debs Hartke, a character in the Kurt Vonnegut novel Hocus Pocus